Souha Bechara (born 15 June 1967) is a Lebanese former prisoner at the Khiam detention center. In 1988, she unsuccessfully attempted to assassinate Antoine Lahad, the then-leader of the Israel-backed South Lebanon Army (SLA); she was subsequently arrested and held at the SLA's notorious prison facility in Khiam for ten years.

Early life 
Bechara was born in Deir Mimas, Lebanon, to an Eastern Orthodox Christian family. Her father, Fawaz, was a member of the Lebanese Communist Party, which Bechara herself also joined secretly in 1982. During the Israeli occupation of Southern Lebanon, she was active within various leftist political and militant movements, including Jammoul and the Union of Lebanese Democratic Youth.

Attempted assassination 
Bechara left college in 1986 and joined resistance activities in Lebanon. She was given the task of assassinating Lahad. Consequently, she headed south, introduced herself to Lahad's family as an aerobics instructor to his wife Minerva. Gradually, she familiarised herself with the family's members and visited them continually.
On the evening of the operation, 17 November 1988, Lahad's wife invited Bechara for tea. Bechara accepted the invitation and stayed until Lahad's arrival.  As she was packing her belongings and leaving, Bechara twice shot Lahad with a 5.45 mm revolver. He was shot once in the chest and once in the shoulder, then Bechara threw the gun away before his body guards arrested her.

Lahad was rushed to  a hospital and spent eight weeks there, suffering from serious health complications. His left arm was paralysed. Bechara was detained by the security guards in the house, taken to Israel briefly, where she was interrogated and beaten. She was then taken to Khiam prison for ten years, without being charged or tried. She suffered electric shock torture and six years of solitary confinement in a tiny cell.

Bechara was released on September 3, 1998, following an intense Lebanese and European campaign.

Private life 
After her release, Bechara moved to France and then to Geneva, Switzerland, where she married a Swiss national, with whom she has two children. She has also worked with Collectif Urgence Palestine–Genève. Bechara remains a frequent lecturer and advocate for a socialist, democratic, and non-sectarian Lebanon.

Writing 
In 2000, she published her autobiography, Résistante, relating her early life and her years in jail. English and Arabic translations following in 2003. In 2011, Bechara published another autobiography, whose Arabic title translates as I Dream of a Cell of Cherries. Her co-author, Cosette Elias Ibrahim, is a Lebanese journalist who was also detained in the Khiam prison. She was released on 22 May 2000, when Israel pulled out of the south of Lebanon and the South Lebanon Army forces abandoned the Khiam prison.

Parts of Bechara's story were used in Wajdi Mouawad's 2003 play Incendies, which Denis Villeneuve adapted to the screen in his 2010 film of the same title.

References

External links 
Suha Bechara Interview
Signature of "I dream of a cell of cherries"
Soha Bechara, Resistance
An ongoing discussion on the Lebanon-Israel conflict
A 40:00 conversation with Soha Bechara, film by Jayce Salloum

1967 births
Living people
Lebanese people imprisoned abroad
Lebanese torture victims
Prisoners and detainees of Israel
People from South Lebanon
Lebanese left-wing activists
Lebanese activists
Lebanese assassins
Lebanese communists
Eastern Orthodox Christians from Lebanon
Greek Orthodox Christians from Lebanon